Kanker is a municipality and the headquarters of Kanker District, in the Indian state of Chhattisgarh. It is the second largest city of Bastar division after Jagdalpur.

Geography
It has an average elevation of 388 metres (1272 feet).

Demographics
, Kanker has a population of 51,385. Males are 51.6% of the population and females are 49.4%. The literacy rate is 77%, higher than the national average of 59.5%. Male literacy is 83% and female literacy is 71%. In Kanker, 12% of the population is less than 23 years old.

Transport
Kanker is located on National Highway 30 (known as Raipur-Jagdalpur-Vizianagram Road) 140 km from the state capital Raipur and 160 km from the divisional headquarters Jagdalpur. Roads provide access to other parts of the state. Coaches operated by different private bus operators run at frequent intervals to major towns and cities of the state. A shared cab facility offers connection to neighbouring local routes. The nearest airport and major railway station is in Raipur.

Gallery of places around Kanker

References

Cities and towns in Kanker district